Qeshlaq-e Farajollah may refer to:
Qeshlaq-e Farajollah Hajj Sarkhan
Qeshlaq-e Farajollah Nemaz
Qeshlaq-e Farajollah Qadir